In the 2014–15 season, Partizani Tirana competed in the Kategoria Superiore for the second consecutive season.

Players

Italics players who left the team during the season.
Bold players who came in the team during the season.

Transfers

In

Out

Pre-season and friendlies

Competitions

Kategoria Superiore

League table

Results summary

Results by round

Matches

Albanian Cup

First round

Second round

Quarter-finals

Notes

References

External links
Official website 

Partizani
FK Partizani Tirana seasons